RTL2 may refer to:

 RTL II, a German general-interest television channel
 RTL 2 (Croatia), a Croatian commercial broadcaster with national availability
 RTL2 (France), a French private radio station, based in Paris
 RTL II (Hungary), a Hungarian commercial broadcaster
 RTL/2, a real-time programming language based on Algol 68
 RTL Zwee, a Luxembourg television channel for young adults